Spring Shower is a 1932 French-Hungarian drama film directed by Pál Fejös and starring Annabella, Ilona Dajbukát and Erzsi Bársony. A French-language version Marie, légende hongroise and a Romanian-language version Prima dragoste were also released. It was made by the French-based producer Adolphe Osso who had money reserves frozen by the Hungarian government, and needed to spend the money in Hungary.

Cast
 Annabella - Szabó Mária 
 Ilona Dajbukát - A jegyzõné 
 Erzsi Bársony - A jegyzõné lánya 
 Steven Geray - Urasági intézõ 
 Karola Zala - A Fortuna tulajdonosa 
 Margit Ladomerszky - A kávéház szépe 
 Sándor Pethes - Táncmester 
 Lajos Várady - Táncmester 
 Zoltán Makláry  -Vasutas 
 Gusztáv Vándory - Tisztelendõ 
 Lajos Ihász - Patikus 
 György Kerekes - Egy ficsúr

References

Bibliography
 Buranbaeva, Oksana & Mladineo, Vanja. Culture and Customs of Hungary. ABC-CLIO, 2011.
 Burns, Bryan. World Cinema: Hungary. Fairleigh Dickinson University Press, 1996.
 Cunningham, John. Hungarian Cinema: From Coffee House to Multiplex. Wallflower Press, 2004.

External links

1932 films
1930s fantasy drama films
French fantasy drama films
Hungarian fantasy drama films
1930s Hungarian-language films
Films directed by Paul Fejos
Hungarian multilingual films
Films about the afterlife
1932 drama films
Hungarian black-and-white films
1932 multilingual films
1930s French films